International Telegram may refer to:

 International telegram, a telegram sent from one country to another
 iTelegram, a telegram-delivery service